The 2014 India Grand Prix Gold was the first tournament of the 2014 BWF Grand Prix Gold and Grand Prix. The tournament was held in Babu Banarasi Das Indoor Stadium, Lucknow, India from 21 January until 26 January 2014 and had a total purse of $120,000.

Players by nation

Men's singles

Seeds

  Kashyap Parupalli (third round)
  Ajay Jayaram (third round)
  R. M. V. Gurusaidutt (third round)
  Anand Pawar (third round)
  Brice Leverdez (second round)
  Srikanth Kidambi (final)
  Prannoy Kumar (semi-final)
  Sourabh Varma (third round)
  Xue Song (champion)
  Misha Zilberman (second round)
  B. Sai Praneeth (quarter-final)
  Zulfadli Zulkiffli (quarter-final)
  Iskandar Zulkarnain Zainuddin (quarter-final)
  Arvind Bhat (third round)
  Chetan Anand (third round)
  Subhankar Dey (quarter-final)

Finals

Top half

Section 1

Section 2

Section 3

Section 4

Bottom half

Section 5

Section 6

Section 7

Section 8

Women's singles

Seeds

  Saina Nehwal (champion)
  P. V. Sindhu (final)
  Nichaon Jindapon (withdrew)
  Lindaweni Fanetri (semi-final)
  Bellaetrix Manuputty (quarter-final)
  Deng Xuan (semi-final)
  Hera Desi (quarter-final)
  Suo Di (withdrew)

Finals

Top half

Section 1

Section 2

Bottom half

Section 3

Section 4

Men's doubles

Seeds

  Marcus Fernaldi Gideon / Markis Kido (withdrew)
  Pranav Chopra / Akshay Dewalkar (semi-final)
  Manu Attri / B. Sumeeth Reddy (quarter-final)
  Li Junhui / Liu Yuchen (champion)
  Fran Kurniawan / Bona Septano (quarter-final)
  Andrei Adistia / Hendra Aprida Gunawan (quarter-final)
  Chooi Kah Ming / Teo Ee Yi (second round)
  Huang Kaixiang / Zheng Siwei (final)

Finals

Top half

Section 1

Section 2

Bottom half

Section 3

Section 4

Women's doubles

Seeds

  Pia Zebadiah / Rizki Amelia Pradipta (quarter-final)
  Vivian Hoo Kah Mun / Woon Khe Wei (semi-final)
  Amelia Alicia Anscelly / Soong Fie Cho (second round)
  Huang Yaqiong / Yu Xiaohan (final)

Finals

Top half

Section 1

Section 2

Bottom half

Section 3

Section 4

Mixed doubles

Seeds

  Markis Kido / Pia Zebadiah (withdrew)
  Tan Aik Quan / Lai Pei Jing (quarter-final)
  Ong Jian Guo / Lim Yin Loo (second round)
  Tarun Kona / Ashwini Ponnappa (second round)

Finals

Top half

Section 1

Section 2

Bottom half

Section 3

Section 4

References

Syed Modi International Badminton Championships
India
Open
India Open Grand Prix Gold
Sport in Lucknow